The Silver Helmet (SK) is an annual speedway event held each year organised by the Polish Motor Union (PZM) since 1966.

Previous winners

 (+1971, all three riders finished on 54 points)

References

Helmet Silver